LLT may refer to:
Laser lithotripsy, a surgical procedure to remove urinary stones
LLT GM High Feature engine, a type of engine
Lucas–Lehmer primality test for Mersenne numbers
Cholesky decomposition, an algorithm to decompose matrix A into a lower Matrix L : A = LLT.